Operation Alphabet  was an evacuation, authorised on 24 May 1940, of Allied (British, French and Polish) troops from the harbour of Narvik in northern Norway marking the success of Operation Weserübung (the German invasion of 9 April) and the end of the Allied campaign in Norway during World War II. The evacuation was completed by 8 June.

The evacuation was prompted by the Wehrmachts assault on Belgium, the Netherlands, Luxembourg and France in the spring of 1940, which reduced the relative importance of Germany's iron ore provision and of Scandinavia. Several nights after the final military evacuation, the civilians of the town were rescued by British Sub-Lieutenant Patrick Dalzel-Job. Against orders, he organised local fishing boats to remove the population just before a German reprisal bombing. Much of the town was destroyed but only four people were killed. The Royal Navy wanted to discipline Dalzel-Job but was unable to, after King Haakon VII awarded him the Knights Cross of the Order of Saint Olav (First Class). Later in the war, he served with Ian Fleming. Many sources cite Dalzel-Job as the inspiration for the James Bond character.

A consequence of the evacuation of Allied troops from Norway was that Sweden's and Finland's position vis-à-vis Nazi Germany was weakened. An agreement was reached in June leading to extensive transfers of (unarmed) Wehrmacht troops on Swedish railways – probably Sweden's chief digression from her policy of neutrality between the parties of the war – and in August Finland concluded a secret agreement according to which Finland could acquire weapons through Germany and Germany could transfer (armed) troops by truck through northernmost Finland. Nazi Germany and the Soviet Union, still united by the Molotov–Ribbentrop Pact, had excluded other international powers from influence in Northern Europe.

See also 
 List of British military equipment of World War II
 List of French military equipment of World War II
 List of Norwegian military equipment of World War II
 List of German military equipment of World War II

Sources
 Hauge, Andreas (1995)  Kampene i Norge 1940 (Sandefjord: Krigshistorisk Forlag)  Norwegian
 Kristiansen, Trond (2006) Fjordkrigen – Sjømilitær motstand mot den tyske invasjonsflåten i 1940 (Harstad: Forlaget Kristiansen)  Norwegian

Norwegian campaign
1940 in Norway
Evacuations
Naval battles and operations of World War II involving the United Kingdom
May 1940 events
June 1940 events
Conflicts in 1940